is the debut studio album by Japanese rock band Aqua Timez released on December 6, 2006.  It reached #3 on the Oricon charts.

Aqua Timez's first single, "Ketsui no Asa ni", is featured in the film Brave Story, and their second single, "Sen no Yoru o Koete," is the theme song from the Bleach film Bleach: Memories of Nobody.

Track listing
 "1mm"
 "Hoshi no Mienai Yoru (星の見えない夜; Starless Night)"
 "No Rain, No Rainbow"
 "Ketsui no Asa ni (決意の朝に; In the Morning of Decision)"
 "Hachimitsu (Daddy, Daddy) (ハチミツ～Daddy,Daddy～; Honey (Daddy, Daddy))"
 "Sen no Yoru wo Koete (千の夜を越えて; Pass a Thousand Nights)"
 "Green-bird"
 "Ayumi (歩み; Walking)"
 "Mastermind (マスターマインド; Masutāmaindo)"
 "White Hall (ホワイトホール; Howaito Hōru)"
 "Present (プレゼント; Purezento)"
 "Perfect World"
 "Itsumo Issho (いつもいっしょ; Always Together)"
 "Shiroi Mori (白い森; White Forest)"

External links
 Track listing

2006 debut albums
Aqua Timez albums